Sekhemre-Wahkhau Rahotep was an Egyptian pharaoh who reigned during the Second Intermediate Period, when Egypt was ruled by multiple kings. The Egyptologists Kim Ryholt and Darrell Baker believe that Rahotep was the first king of the 17th Dynasty.



Attestations
Rahotep seem to be attested at Abydos and Coptos.

[1] Rahotep is known from a stele found at Coptos reporting the restoration of the temple of Min. The stele, now in the Petrie Museum (UC 14327), reads

[2] Rahotep is also attested on a limestone stele, now in the British Museum (BM EA 833), which shows him making an offering to Osiris for two deceased, an officer and a priest. The stela appears to have been made at a workshop at Abydos. Other stelae produced by this workshop belong to king Sekhemrekhutawy Pantjeny and king Wepwawetemsaf. All three kings reigned therefore quite close in time.

[3] Finally Rahotep is mentioned on a bow of a king's son Ameny dedicated to "the service of Min in all his feasts" at Coptos.

[4] In the late New Kingdom tale Khonsuemheb and the Ghost, the protagonist encounters a ghost who claims to have been in life "Overseer of the treasuries of king Rahotep". However, the ghost also claims to have died in regnal Year 14 of a later king Mentuhotep. These statements seem to contradict each other since none of Rahotep's successors named Mentuhotep are known to have reigned for so long, thus making the identification of both these kings problematic.

Theories

While Ryholt and Baker propose that Rahotep was the first king of the 17th Dynasty, Jürgen von Beckerath sees him as the second king of that dynasty.
Alternatively, Claude Vandersleyen has tentatively dated Rahotep to the 13th Dynasty on the grounds that he believes Rahotep to be related to Sobekemsaf I, which Vandersleyen also dates to the 13th Dynasty because of the quality and number of statues attributable to him. Baker deems these arguments "slim and rejected by most scholars".

If he was indeed a ruler of the early 17th Dynasty, Rahotep would have controlled Upper Egypt as far north as Abydos. According to Ryholt's reconstruction of the Second Intermediate Period, Rahotep's reign would have taken place shortly after the collapse of the 16th Dynasty with the conquest of Thebes by the Hyksos and their subsequent withdrawal from the region. In the wake of the conflict, the Hyksos would have looted and destroyed temples and palaces. Rahotep consequently "boasts of restorations [he performed] in temples at Abydos and Coptos". In Abydos, he had the enclosure walls of the temple of Osiris renewed and in Coptos he restored the temple of Min of which "gates and doors [have] fallen into ruins". This chronology of events is debated and some scholars contest that Thebes was ever conquered by the Hyksos. Rather, they believe the kings of Upper Egypt could have been vassals of the Hyksos.

References

16th-century BC Pharaohs
Pharaohs of the Seventeenth Dynasty of Egypt